Helen Elizabeth Skelton (born 19 July 1983) is an English television presenter and actress. She co-presented the BBC children's programme Blue Peter from 2008 until 2013, and since 2014 has been a presenter on Countryfile. She also co-presented two series of the BBC One programme Holiday Hit Squad alongside Angela Rippon and Joe Crowley. She also presented the daytime series The Instant Gardener that ran for two series.

Early life 
Skelton was born on 19 July 1983, in Carlisle, Cumbria, England, and brought up on a dairy farm in the village of Kirkby Thore. She attended its local Primary School, and then Appleby Grammar School, ultimately graduating from Cumbria Institute of the Arts, where she gained a BA degree in journalism. During her time at college, she worked as an extra on Coronation Street and Cutting It.

Skelton has said that if she was not a broadcaster, she would be a teacher. Her brother Gavin was a professional footballer and has also been a player-manager.

Career

Early career 
After briefly working in public relations, Skelton decided to concentrate on journalism. She worked in the newsroom at CFM Radio, and was involved with various programmes at Border Television, before becoming a breakfast presenter on BBC Radio Cumbria in 2005, one of the youngest breakfast slot presenters on the BBC network at that time. She was then a reporter and occasional presenter on children's news programme Newsround and its weekend sports-based version, Sportsround.

Television 
Skelton was revealed as a presenter on Blue Peter on 28 August 2008, replacing Zöe Salmon and becoming the 33rd presenter for the programme. In a challenge for the series, Skelton took an uncredited role in the BBC production of Merlin. In August 2013, she announced her departure from the show; she was replaced by Radzi Chinyanganya. Skelton worked on other projects during her time on Blue Peter, mainly correspondent-based; these included reporting from the Championships, Wimbledon.

After her departure from Blue Peter, Skelton became a presenter of live FA Women's Super League football matches for the BT Sport channel, as well as retaining her BBC reporter roles. She has occasionally presented segments of Countryfile since 2008, and also presented two series of Holiday Hit Squad in 2013/14 alongside Angela Rippon and Joe Crowley. In 2014/15, she presented the London Marathon Highlights show on the BBC. She was replaced by Ore Oduba in 2016.

In December 2012, Skelton took part in a Christmas Special edition of the BBC One programme Strictly Come Dancing. Since 2015, Skelton has co-presented daytime BBC One series The Instant Gardener alongside Danny Clarke. In early 2016, she presented Tonight: Kids V Career.

Skelton also hosted coverage of the 2016 European Swimming Championships with Mark Foster and Rebecca Adlington. She worked for the BBC at the 2016 Summer Olympics presenting swimming coverage alongside Rebecca Adlington, Adrian Moorhouse, Andy Jameson and Mark Foster. In October that year, Skelton guest presented five editions of Lorraine on ITV, plus further five in February 2017. She also co-presented two editions of Walks with My Dog on More4 in 2017; in the same year, Skelton returned to host the swimming coverage on the BBC during the 2017 World Aquatics Championships with Adlington and Foster.

Skelton appeared in Celebrity Antiques Road Trip (series 8 episode 14) with her friend and ex-co-presenter Rebecca Adlington.

From 24 September 2022, Skelton competed in the twentieth series of Strictly Come Dancing, partnered with professional dancer Gorka Marquez.

On Saturday 22 October Skelton danced the Charleston with professional partner Gorka Marquez on 'Strictly Come Dancing' to the Blue Peter theme tune as a part of the celebrations of BBC's 100th Anniversary. Skelton, jointly achieved top leader position on week 7 of 'Strictly Come Dancing' for her Jive, on Saturday 5 November. She easily made it through week 8, by dancing the Salsa, on the 12 November competition evening, to reach Blackpool's heralded Extravaganza scheduled for 19 November 2022.

Writing 
Skelton's first novel, Amy Wild: Amazon Summer, was published in May 2015.

Radio 
Skelton hosts a weekly slot on BBC Radio 5 Live on Sundays from 3pm to 6pm and acts as temporary co-host on BBC Radio 5 Live Drive Time with Tony Livesey. From 14 August 2022, Skelton will replace Laura Whitmore in presenting BBC Radio 5 Live's new-look morning show, every Sunday between 10am-12pm.

Challenges

Wheelchair dance contest challenge 
In December 2008, Skelton entered and won the Malta Open Dance Competition with a 16-year-old wheelchair user as her partner, defeating 100 other dancers.

Ultra marathons 
In April 2009, Skelton became only the second woman ever to finish the  Namibian ultra marathon. She completed the run in 23 hours and 45 minutes – just 15 minutes under the time limit of one day. She told Newsround: 'It was a gruelling experience, but one I'll never forget. There were tough times but also amazing times.' Skelton has also completed the London Marathon on three occasions; 2009, 2014 and 2019.

Kayaking the Amazon 
In early 2010, Skelton kayaked the entire length of the River Amazon for Sport Relief 2010. She kayaked  on a solo journey from Nauta in Peru on 20 January, to Almeirim, Brazil on 28 February. She achieved two entries in the Guinness World Records: the longest solo journey by kayak, and the longest distance in a kayak in 24 hours by a woman.

Nigel Evans, the member of parliament for the Ribble Valley, tabled an Early Day Motion in the House of Commons after her Amazon challenge:

Tightrope walking 
Skelton walked a 150-metre tightrope between chimneys at Battersea Power Station, 66 metres above ground, to raise money for Comic Relief on 28 February 2011. Blue Peter created two specials about her walk.

South Pole 
In 2012, Skelton raised more money for Sport Relief by becoming the first person to reach the South Pole using a bicycle. She also used skis and a kite to help her pull a sled containing 82 kg of supplies.
Skelton covered  by kite ski, 103 by bike and 68 by cross-country ski. She is also the first person to claim a world record for the fastest 100 km by kite ski, in seven hours 28 minutes, which was set during the trip. Guinness World Records commentated on the award, saying: 'We are aware of explorers who have achieved longer distances, but Helen Skelton’s application was the first that Guinness World Records had received specifically for the 100-kilometre distance.' Blue Peter also made five six-episode specials for this event.

Helen's Magnificent 7 
In April 2013, wanting to inspire Blue Peter viewers to do something to support Comic Relief, Skelton took on seven challenges set by Comic Relief while breaking one world record. She called this series of challenges her "Magnificent 7", a reference to the 1960 Western The Magnificent Seven:

 Rugby Kick – failed
 Performing In Two Shows In One Night – succeeded
 Flying With the Red Arrows – succeeded
 Photo Shoot – succeeded
 Rope Bridge – succeeded
 Longest Line of Bunting – succeeded (at the time, a World Record)
 Coin Toss – failed

Sport Relief 

In March 2018, Skelton took part in a celebrity boxing match defeating Camilla Thurlow via unanimous decision after three 2-minute rounds for the BBC's Sport Relief

Personal life 
In December 2013, Skelton married England national rugby league team player Richie Myler, and gave birth to their first child, a boy, on 19 June 2015. After Myler joined the Catalans Dragons club, they moved to France in September 2015. He currently plays for the Yorkshire club Leeds Rhinos. Their second son was born in April 2017  and their first daughter was born on 28 December 2021.

Skelton announced via her Instagram account 25 April 2022, that she and Myler were no longer a couple, as he had left the family home. It was later revealed on Instagram that his new girlfriend, heiress, Stephanie Thirkill, was pregnant with their first child.

Filmography 
Television

Guest appearances 
What's Cooking? (2013) – Guest
Countdown (2013) – 'Dictionary Corner' guest
The Chase: Celebrity Special (2013) – Contestant
All Star Family Fortunes (2015) – Contestant
Blue Peter (2015) – Guest
The TV That Made Me (2015) – Subject
Pointless Celebrities – Contestant
Sunday Brunch (2013, 2014, 2015, 2016, 2019) – Guest

References

External links 

Helen Skelton (BBC Radio 5 Live)

1983 births
Living people
Alumni of the University of Cumbria
BBC Radio 5 Live presenters
Blue Peter presenters
English radio presenters
English television actresses
English television presenters
Kayakers
Newsround presenters
People from Carlisle, Cumbria
English expatriates in France
British women television journalists
British women radio presenters
BBC Radio 2 presenters
BT Sport presenters and reporters
People educated at Appleby Grammar School